The name Atring has been used to name nine tropical cyclones in the Philippine Area of Responsibility by PAGASA in the Western Pacific Ocean.

 Tropical Depression Atring (1965), only recognized by PAGASA.
 Typhoon Susan (1969) (T6903, 03W, Atring)
 Tropical Storm Wilda (1973) (T7301, 01W, Atring), struck China
 Tropical Depression Atring (1977)
 Tropical Depression Atring (1981), designated as a tropical depression by PAGASA; not named as a tropical storm by the Joint Typhoon Warning Center (JTWC)
 Tropical Storm Fabian (1985) (T8501, 02W, Atring), passed near Yap
 Tropical Storm Winona (1989) (T8901, 01W, Atring), formed southeast of Hawaii; travelled west of the International Dateline and dissipated north of Mindanao
 Tropical Depression Atring (1993) (01W), formed near the Philippines; made landfall on Mindanao 
 Tropical Storm Hannah (1997) (01W, Atring, Japan Meteorological Agency analyzed it as a tropical depression, not as a tropical storm), an early-season storm that approached the Philippines, but died out before affecting land

Pacific typhoon set index articles